Photobacterium leiognathi is a species of Gram-negative bacteria. The species is bioluminescent and a symbiont of ponyfish (family Leiognathidae).

References

External links
Type strain of Photobacterium leiognathi at BacDive -  the Bacterial Diversity Metadatabase

Vibrionales
Bioluminescent bacteria